Quik Internet (NZ) Limited was a New Zealand based ISP, which began trading in 1998. It offered dialup, broadband and toll services nationwide. On 4 September 2006 it merged with the larger New Zealand ISP Ihug.

Quik Internet currently employs around 23 people. Its general manager is Scott Bartlett.
See also Broadband Internet Access (New Zealand)

External links
 Quik Internet

Internet service providers of New Zealand
New Zealand companies established in 1998
Telecommunications companies established in 1998
Telecommunications companies disestablished in 2006
2006 disestablishments in New Zealand